Sycamore is an unincorporated community in northern Montgomery County, Kansas, United States.  As of the 2020 census, the population of the community and nearby areas was 70.  It is located along U.S. Route 75 north of the city of Independence.

History
Sycamore was founded when the railroad was first built through the area.

The post office, established as Lay in 1887, was renamed Sycamore in 1896.  It has a post office with the ZIP code 67363.

Geography
Its elevation is 843 feet (257 m), and it is located at  (37.3270085, -95.7155358).

Climate
The climate in this area is characterized by hot, humid summers and generally mild to cool winters.  According to the Köppen Climate Classification system, Sycamore has a humid subtropical climate, abbreviated "Cfa" on climate maps.

Demographics

For statistical purposes, the United States Census Bureau has defined this community as a census-designated place (CDP).

Education
The community is served by Independence USD 446 public school district.

References

Further reading

External links
 Montgomery County maps: Current, Historic, KDOT

Unincorporated communities in Montgomery County, Kansas
Unincorporated communities in Kansas